CS Media is a major media company, located in the center of Yerevan, capital of Armenia. Armenian-American businessman and philanthropist Gerard Cafesjian is a major shareholder in the business.

CS Media includes a number of Armenian leading media companies in what it calls the "CS Media City" on approximately 40,000 square meters which include television and radio studios, various offices, a concert hall, cinema, publishing house, restaurant.

CS Media has the following outlets:
 Armenia TV, with broadcasting network throughout Armenia, Republic of Artsakh and via satellite worldwide with transmissions covering Europe, the Middle East, Russia and the United States.
 TV5, an Armenian entertainment 24-hour TV channel in partnership with MTV music channel.
 ArmNews, a 24-hours news TV-Channel covering local and international news, and beaming at times EuroNews International programs.
 First Channel, presenting CNN TV-Channel in Armenia
 Radio 107, a 24-hour FM radio station
 CS Records, technically advanced recording studio functioning in Armenia. It provides a complete volume of music production and recording. 
 A-UP Company, the satellite broadcaster of CS Media companies. 
 CS Publishing House publishing a daily newspaper, magazine and a TV-Guide. It has expanded internationally buying and publishing the Armenian Reporter in two print editions in the United States through offices in Paramus, New Jersey, Burbank, California, Washington, D.C. and in Yerevan. It intends to expand further the publishing of new print-press.

External links
 USArmeniaTV
 USATV Official website
 Official CS Media website
 Armenia TV official website 
 TV5 Armenia official website
 FM107 radio official website

Mass media in Armenia